Beuzevillette is a commune in the Seine-Maritime department in the Normandy region in northern France.

Heraldry

Geography

Population

Places of interest
 The church of St. Aubin, dating from the twelfth century.
 A thirteenth-century stone cross.

See also
Communes of the Seine-Maritime department

References

Communes of Seine-Maritime